Poncin is a commune in the Ain department in eastern France. It lies on the banks of the river Ain.

History
Of strategic importance during medieval times, Poncin is surrounded by city walls that are still in perfect shape despite their age. The village was originally intended to receive the same patronage as Pérouges but the plan never reached fruition.

Population

See also
Communes of the Ain department

References

Communes of Ain
Ain communes articles needing translation from French Wikipedia